Etoi Ki (O'odham: I'itoi ki:) is a summit in the Pima County, Arizona, United States. It is west of Kitt Peak National Observatory and northwest of the unincorporated community of Sells.

References

Landforms of Pima County, Arizona
Mountains of Arizona
Mountains of Pima County, Arizona